Robinsonekspedisjonen: 2001, was the third season of the Norwegian version of the Swedish show Expedition Robinson and it premiered on 9 September 2001 and aired until 2 December 2001. The third season took place on an island in Malaysia. In episode five of this season, the first twist took place which was a tribal swap took place. Along with this twist starting in episode five the tribe that won immunity voted out a member of the losing tribe. When the merge came so did the season's joker, Annbjørg Østerås who along with Conny Hansen and Erik Torjusen moved to a new, merge camp in episode 6. For the first time in the history of Expedition Robinson, there was a final three instead of a final two and for the first time in the Norwegian version of the show the public were allowed to award a jury vote to the finalist of their choice. Ultimately, Mia Martinsen won the season with a jury vote of 4-3-2 over Trude Hole and Anders Dahle

Finishing order

External links
http://www.dagbladet.no/kultur/2001/08/23/276783.html?i=2
http://www.dagbladet.no/kultur/2001/08/23/276782-15.html

 2001
2001 Norwegian television seasons